Events in the year 1888 in Norway.

Incumbents
Monarch – Oscar II
Prime Minister – Johan Sverdrup

Events
In the Norwegian parliamentary election the Conservative Party of Norway wins the most seats

Arts and literature

Notable births
  
 

1 January – Kristian Albert Christiansen, politician (died 1966).
7 January – Thorstein Johansen, rifle shooter and Olympic gold medallist (died 1963)
12 January – Jon Andrå, politician (died 1966)
16 January – Harald Pedersen, metallurgist (died 1945).
20 January – Tor Lund, gymnast and Olympic gold medallist (died 1972)
4 February – Gunnar Nordbye, United States federal judge (died 1977)
16 February – Ferdinand Bie, long jumper and Olympic gold medallist (died 1961)
16 February – Aldor Ingebrigtsen, politician (died 1952)
21 February – Knut Gysler, equestrian (died 1967).
4 March – Knute Rockne, American football player and coach (died 1931)
5 March – Ivar Skjånes, politician (died 1975)
9 March – John Bjørnstad, rowing coxswain (died 1968).
24 March – Olof Jacobsen, gymnast and Olympic bronze medallist
28 March – Harald Smedvik, gymnast and Olympic silver medallist (died 1956)
2 April – Nicolai Kiær, gymnast and Olympic silver medallist (died 1934)
4 April – Aanund Bjørnsson Berdal, engineer (died 1981).
10 April – Alfred Madsen, engineer, newspaper editor, trade unionist and politician (died 1962)
12 April – Ejnar Tønsager, rower (died 1967)
14 April – Rasmus Birkeland, sailor and Olympic gold medallist (died 1972)
14 April – Edvard Christian Danielsen, military officer (died 1964).
10 May – Thore Michelsen, rower and Olympic bronze medallist (died 1980)
13 May – Peder Nikolai Leier Jacobsen, politician (died 1967)
27 May – Ole Aarnæs, high jumper (died 1992)
3 July – Harald Eriksen, gymnast and Olympic gold medallist (died 1968)
23 August – Ivar Asbjørn Følling, physician (died 1973)
1 September – Gabriel Thorstensen, gymnast and Olympic gold medallist (died 1974)
29 September – Johannes Andersen, long distance runner (died 1967)
4 October – Oscar Mathisen, speed skater (died 1954)
15 October – Leif Erichsen, sailor and Olympic silver medallist (died 1924)
16 October – Ivar Kristiansen Hognestad, politician (died 1973)
24 October – Anders Haugen, ski jumper (died 1984).
15 November – Harald Sverdrup, oceanographer and meteorologist (died 1957)

Full date unknown
Torgeir Anderssen-Rysst, politician and Minister (died 1958)
Sverre Grette, judge (died 1959)
Lars Høgvold, ski jumper (died 1961)
Jørg Tofte Jebsen, physicist (died 1922)
Per Mathias Jespersen, gymnast and Olympic silver medallist
Gustav Smedal, jurist and irredentist activist (died 1951)

Notable deaths

9 January – Theodor Peterson, businessperson and politician (born 1839)
17 June – Hans Jensen, businessperson (born 1817)
22 June – Edmund Neupert, pianist and composer (born 1842)
1 July – Vilhelm Frimann Christie Bøgh, archivist (born 1817)
25 October – Theodor Kjerulf, geologist and poet (born 1825)

Full date unknown
Erik Eriksen, ice sea captain (born 1820)
Nicolai Friis, politician (born 1815)
Christen Knudsen, ship-owner (born 1813)
Ole Richter, lawyer, politician and Prime Minister of Norway (born 1829)
Sjur Aasmundsen Sexe, mineralogist (born 1808)

See also

References